Sar or Sara, also known as Madjingay and Sara Madjingay is a Bongo–Bagirmi language of southern Chad, and the lingua franca of regional capital of Sarh.

Phonology 
The consonants are as follows.

Vowels and nasal vowels are as follows:

/o, e/ can also be heard as [ə].

There are three tones.

References

External links
The Sara-Bagirmi Language Project -- Sar

Bongo–Bagirmi languages
Languages of Chad